Kelefa is a castle and village in Mani, Laconia, Greece. It is part of the municipal unit of Oitylo.

History

The castle of Kelefa is located about half-way between the current village of Kelefa and the Bay of Oitylo. It was built in 1679 by the Ottomans, in order to contain the Inner Mani region. Some years later, in 1685, the Maniots besieged the castle. They sent messengers to Venice so the Doge could send a fleet to help them capture the castle. The Venetians were currently at war with the Ottomans so they agreed and sent a fleet under Francesco Morosini. As soon the fleets bearing the symbol of St Mark the Ottoman garrison surrendered. A year later the Ottomans returned with a strong force and laid siege to the castle but were driven back. Along with the rest of the Peloponnese, the castle remained in Venetian hands for about 30 years, but in 1715 the Ottomans recaptured the Peloponnese. Around 1780 the Ottomans abandoned the castle, which became derelict.

Now Kelefa is a small village.

Historical population

See also
List of settlements in Laconia

References

1679 establishments in the Ottoman Empire
Infrastructure completed in 1679
17th-century architecture in Greece
17th-century fortifications
Populated places in Laconia
Populated places in the Mani Peninsula
Ottoman fortifications in Greece
East Mani